Aircraft Repair Plant No 405 (Авиационный ремонтный завод, ARZ-405) , in Kazakhstan, was established as an aircraft maintenance facility in 1939 and is situated next door to Almaty International Airport. The plant occupies over 70,000 square metres of land with production facilities of 10,000 square metres. It employs over 200 well-trained specialists.

Services 
ARZ-405 is a leading aircraft repair enterprise in Central Asia certified for performing overhaul, modernization, repair and technical maintenance of the Mi-8 helicopter and its modifications including fuselage and its systems. Up to twelve Mi-8 helicopters can be overhauled at a fully equipped hangar simultaneously.

See also 
 :ru:Список авиационных заводов России - List of aircraft factories in Russia

External links 
 Burundaiavia official website

Transport in Kazakhstan
Kazakh Air Defense Forces
Air force logistics units and formations
Aerospace companies